Papilio xanthopleura is a species of swallowtail butterfly from the genus Papilio that is found in Peru and Brazil.

Description
Sides of the abdomen yellow; under surface of the hindwing, without discal band, the red submarginal spots large. The female in two forms: female -f. xanthopleura is similar to the male, while female-f. diaphora Stgr. has a large pale yellow area on the upperside of the forewing.

References

Lewis, H. L., 1974 Butterflies of the World  Page 25, figure 16.

External links

xanthopleura
Butterflies described in 1868
Papilionidae of South America
Taxa named by Frederick DuCane Godman
Taxa named by Osbert Salvin